The Sporting News Comeback Player of the Year Award is the oldest of three annual awards in Major League Baseball given to one player in each league who has reemerged as a star in that season. It was established in 1965. The winner in each league is selected by the TSN editorial staff.

In 2005, Major League Baseball officially sponsored its own Comeback Player of the Year Award for the first time. TSN and MLB honored the same players in 2005—Ken Griffey Jr. in the National League and Jason Giambi in the American League. The Players Choice Awards, awarded by the Major League Baseball Players Association, also began a Comeback Player honor in 1992.
 
Listed below are the players honored with the TSN award by year, name, team and league.

Honorees

Notes
The only players to be named twice in the American League are Norm Cash, Boog Powell and Bret Saberhagen.
The only players to be named twice in the National League are Andrés Galarraga, Chris Carpenter and Buster Posey.
The only player to be named in both leagues is Rick Sutcliffe.
The only player to be named posthumously is José Fernández; he died in a boating accident on September 25, 2016.
Since the official MLB Comeback Player of the Year award began in 2005, the recipients have been identical to the TSN award with the following exceptions:  2008 NL (TSN honored Fernando Tatís, MLB honored Brad Lidge), 2010 AL (TSN honored Vladimir Guerrero, MLB honored Francisco Liriano), 2012 AL (TSN honored Adam Dunn, MLB honored Fernando Rodney), 2016 AL (TSN honored Mark Trumbo, MLB honored Rick Porcello), 2016 NL (TSN honored José Fernández, MLB honored Anthony Rendon), 2018 NL (TSN honored Matt Kemp, MLB honored Jonny Venters), 2019 AL (TSN honored Hunter Pence, MLB honored Carlos Carrasco), and 2020 AL (TSN honored Carlos Carrasco, MLB honored Salvador Pérez).
Bob Uecker has joked that he won the Comeback of the Year Award five years in a row. In reality, he never won the award.

See also
Baseball awards
List of MLB awards
TSN Player of the Year
TSN Pitcher of the Year
TSN Rookie of the Year
TSN Reliever of the Year
TSN Manager of the Year
TSN Executive of the Year

Major League Baseball trophies and awards
Awards established in 1965